Aparna Gopinath is an Indian film actress and theatre artist. She debuted in the Malayalam film ABCD: American-Born Confused Desi opposite Dulquer Salmaan.

Early life
Aparna is born into a Malayali family in Chennai. She was a theatre artist and contemporary dancer before her acting debut. She has associated herself with ‘Koothu-P-Pattarai’, an avant-garde theatre movement of Chennai, and had also acted in renowned plays like ‘Six Characters in Search of an Author’, ‘Woyzeck’, ‘Moonshine’, ‘Sky Toffee’, ‘Sangadi Arinjo’ based on seven short stories of Vaikom abhishekh and several Shakespearean plays.

Movie career 
She debuted in movies with Martin Prakkat's ABCD: American-Born Confused Desi which became a super hit. She played the role of Madhumitha, a college student and the love interest of Dulquer Salmaan in the movie. Her second movie as heroine was Asif Ali starrer Bicycle Thieves.

She played the female lead in Mamas' Mannar Mathai Speaking 2 which is a sequel to 1995 cult comedy Mannar Mathai Speaking and Boban Samuel's Happy Journey starred Jayasurya. She played the role of a junior journalist in director Venu's film Munnariyippu starring Mammootty which received rave reviews for her acting skills.
She had signed Mohanlal-Priyadarshan Film Ammu to Ammu but it was later shelved due to production difficulties. In 2016, she completed Kranthi which saw no theatrical release.

Theater career 
In Chennai, she was active in English theatre and was a part of plays like ‘Six Characters in Search of an Author’ and worked with various theatre groups including Masquerade, The Little Theatre, Magic Lantern, Madras Players, Koothu–p-Pattarai. Over years, she has directed and acted in over 50 plays. Her favorite remains "Moonshine And Skytoffeeby", by a Chennai-based group called Perch directed by Rajeev Krishnan.

In 2014, she was a part of ‘Under The Mangosteen Tree’, an adaption of a Vaikom Mohammed Basheer tale.

Awards
 2013 – TTK Prestige-Vanitha Film Awards – Best Debutante actress – ABCD: American-Born Confused Desi
 2013 – Amrita Film Awards for Best New Face – ABCD: American-Born Confused Desi
 2014 – Asiavision Movie Awards (special Jury Award) – Munnariyippu
 2014 – Nominated – 3rd South Indian International Movie Awards for Best Female Debutant  – ABCD: American-Born Confused Desi
 2014 – Nominated -Asianet Film Awards for Best New Face of the Year (Female)  – ABCD: American-Born Confused Desi
 2015 – Nominated – Asianet Film Awards for Best Actress – Munnariyippu
 2015 – Nominated – Campus Choice Cine Awards for Most Popular Actress  – Munnariyippu
 2015 – Nominated – Filmfare Award for Best Actress – Malayalam – Munnariyippu
 2016 – Nominated – Filmfare Award for Best Supporting Actress – Malayalam – Charlie
 2015  – Nominated – 4th South Indian International Movie Awards for Best Actress – Munnariyippu
2016 – 2nd IIFA Utsavam for Performance in a Supporting Role – Female -Malayalam – Charlie

Filmography

References

External links
 

Living people
Indian film actresses
Actresses in Malayalam cinema
Year of birth missing (living people)
Actresses from Chennai
21st-century Indian actresses